José Ignacio "Iñaki" Sáez Ruiz (born 23 April 1943) is a Spanish former football player and manager.

A defender, he spent the vast majority of his professional career with Athletic Bilbao, which he later also coached in various levels, appearing in more than 300 official games with his main club.

In addition to two other clubs (other than Athletic), Sáez managed the Spain national team during two years, being in charge at Euro 2004.

Playing career
Born in Bilbao, Basque Country, Sáez joined local giants Athletic Bilbao in 1962, from neighbouring Barakaldo CF. He totalled 46 La Liga games – with five goals – in his first two seasons combined, but appeared in only 20 in the following three combined, due to injuries.

Again healthy, Sáez appeared regularly for Athletic from 1967 to 1974, helping the Lions to two Copa del Rey trophies, and retired at the age of 31, having appeared in nearly 350 official games for the club. He was part of a legendary defense that also featured José Ángel Iribar in goal, Luis María Echeberría and Jesús Aranguren.

Sáez earned three caps for Spain in one month in 1968, his first and his last appearance being against the same opponent, England, in two losses for the UEFA Euro 1968 qualifying stage (0–1 in London, 1–2 in Madrid).

Coaching career

Club
Aged only 32, Sáez began a managerial career, taking charge of Athletic Bilbao's youth sides for five years. Only two games into the 1980–81 season, Austrian Helmut Senekowitsch was fired, and he led the team to a final ninth position, and returned again to the B-team, helping it to a Segunda División return in 1983.

Sáez again took the reins of the first team in 1985–86, replacing Javier Clemente for the final 13 games of the season, and leading Athletic to the third place, behind Real Madrid and FC Barcelona. In the following four seasons, he coached the reserves in the second level, being again promoted to the first team midway through 1990–91, again replacing Clemente, and being himself fired after round 23 of the following campaign, as the team only finished two points above the relegation zone.

After two spells with UD Las Palmas, both in division three, Sáez was appointed at Albacete Balompié in the top flight, replacing fired Benito Floro in mid-March 1996, his first game in charge being a 0–2 away loss against Real Madrid as the season finished in relegation through the playoffs.

Spain
In the summer of 1996, Sáez was appointed the Spain under-21 team manager, winning the UEFA European Championship two years later after defeating Greece. Also being in charge of the under-20s, he led them to the FIFA World Cup of the category in 1999, in Nigeria.

In 2002, Sáez was named José Antonio Camacho's successor at the helm of the senior team, being in charge until the end of Euro 2004 – which ended in group stage exit – and collecting 15 wins, six draws and two losses in his 23 games in charge.

Subsequently, Sáez returned to the under-21 team, retiring from the football world in 2008 at the age of 65.

Honours

Player
Athletic Bilbao
Copa del Generalísimo: 1969, 1972–73

Manager
Bilbao Athletic
Segunda División B: 1982–83, 1988–89

Spain U18
UEFA European Championship third place: 1997

Spain U19
UEFA European Championship: 2002

Spain U20
FIFA World Youth Championship: 1999

Spain U21
UEFA European Championship: 1998

Spain U23
Summer Olympic silver medal: 2000

References

External links

1943 births
Living people
Spanish footballers
Footballers from Bilbao
Association football defenders
La Liga players
Barakaldo CF footballers
Athletic Bilbao footballers
Spain international footballers
Spanish football managers
La Liga managers
Segunda División managers
Segunda División B managers
Athletic Bilbao B managers
Athletic Bilbao managers
UD Las Palmas managers
Albacete Balompié managers
Spain national under-21 football team managers
Spain national football team managers
UEFA Euro 2004 managers
Spanish Olympic coaches